The Gold Coast is a coastal city in the state of Queensland, Australia, approximately  south-southeast of the centre of the state capital Brisbane. With a population over 600,000, the Gold Coast is the sixth-largest city in Australia, the nation's largest non-capital city, and Queensland's second-largest city after Brisbane. The city's Central Business District is located roughly in the centre of the Gold Coast in the suburb of Southport, with the suburb holding more corporate office space than anywhere else in the city. The urban area of the Gold Coast is concentrated along the coast sprawling almost 60 kilometers, joining up with the Greater Brisbane Metropolitan Area to the north and to the state border with New South Wales to the south. 

Prior to European settlement the area was occupied by the Yugambeh people. The demonym for the Gold Coast is Gold Coaster. 

The Gold Coast is a major tourist destination with a sunny, subtropical climate and has become widely known for its world-class surfing beaches, high-rise dominated skyline, theme parks, nightlife, and rainforest hinterland. The city is part of the nation's entertainment industry with television productions and a major film industry.

History

The Gold Coast is the ancestral home of a number of Indigenous clans of the Yugambeh people, including the Kombumerri, Mununjali, and Wangerriburra clans. Europeans arrived in 1823 when explorer John Oxley landed at Mermaid Beach. The hinterland's red cedar supply attracted people to the area in the mid-19th century.

A number of small townships developed along the coast and in the hinterland. The western suburb of Nerang was surveyed and established as a base for the industry and by 1870 a town reserve had been set aside. By 1873, the town reserve of Burleigh Heads had also been surveyed and successful land sales had taken place. In 1875, the small settlement opposite the boat passage at the head of the Nerang River, known as Nerang Heads or Nerang Creek Heads, was surveyed and renamed Southport, with the first land sales scheduled to take place in Beenleigh. Southport quickly grew a reputation as a secluded holiday destination for wealthy Brisbane residents. 

Post-World War One Era saw the rise of the “seaside shack”. The seaside shack provided the opportunity for the coastal “getaway” with modest investment.  From 1914 to 1946, they popped up all along the South Coast. Seaside shacks were exceedingly cheap and were an early use of the concept of recycling. Many were built of disused or second grade timber, all kinds of materials were used for the holiday seaside shack – including fibro cement, metal containers, and left-over farm sheds; even disused trams were sold off as seaside shacks.

After the establishment of the Surfers Paradise Hotel in the late 1920s, the Gold Coast region grew significantly. The Gold Coast was originally known as the South Coast (because it was south of Brisbane). However, over-inflated prices for real estate and other goods and services led to the nickname of "Gold Coast" from 1950. South Coast locals initially considered the name "Gold Coast" derogatory. However, soon the "Gold Coast" simply became a convenient way to refer to the holiday strip from Southport to Coolangatta. The Town of South Coast was formed through the amalgamation of Town of Coolangatta and Town of Southport along with the coastal areas (such as Burleigh Heads) from the Shire of Nerang on 17 June 1949 with the effect of having the present-day Gold Coast coastal strip as a single local government area. As the tourism industry grew into the 1950s, local businesses began to adopt the term Gold Coast in their names, and on 23 October 1958 the Town of South Coast was renamed Town of Gold Coast. The area was proclaimed a city, despite the lack of a cathedral, less than one year later on 16 May 1959.

The area boomed in the 1980s as a leading tourist destination. In 1994, the City of Gold Coast local government area was expanded to include the Shire of Albert, becoming the second most populous local government area in Australia after the City of Brisbane.

In 2007, the Gold Coast overtook the population of Newcastle, New South Wales, to become the sixth largest city in Australia and the largest non-capital city.

The median age was 39 years old, 1 year older than the nationwide median. The male-to-female ratio was 48.6-to-51.4. The most commonly nominated ancestries were English (29.3%), Australian (22.5%), Irish (8.2%), Scottish (7.5%), and German (3.6%). 64% of people were born in Australia, while the other most common countries of birth were New Zealand (7.9%), England (5.2%), China and South Africa (1.2% each), and Japan (0.7%). Indigenous Australians accounted for 1.7% of the population. The most commonly spoken languages other than English were Mandarin (1.6%), Japanese (1.0%), Korean and Spanish (0.6% each), and Cantonese (0.5%). The most common religious affiliations reported were none (31.8%), Catholic (20.7%), Anglican (16.2%), and Uniting Church (3.9%).

The Gold Coast hosted the 2018 Commonwealth Games.

Geography 

The Gold Coast is approximately half covered by forests of various types. This includes small patches of near-pristine ancient rainforest, mangrove-covered islands, and patches of coastal heathlands and farmland with areas of uncleared eucalyptus forest. Of the plantation pine forests that were planted in the 1950s and 1960s, when commercial forest planting for tax minimisation was encouraged by the Commonwealth government, tiny remnants remain.

Gold Coast City lies in the southeast corner of Queensland, to the south of Brisbane, the state capital. The Albert River separates the Gold Coast from Logan City, a local government area south of the City of Brisbane.

The southernmost town of Gold Coast City, Coolangatta, includes Point Danger and its lighthouse. Coolangatta is a twin city with Tweed Heads located directly across the NSW border. At , this is the most easterly point on the Queensland mainland (Point Lookout on the offshore island of North Stradbroke is slightly further east). From Coolangatta, approximately forty kilometres of holiday resorts and surfing beaches stretch north to the suburb of Main Beach, and then further on Stradbroke Island. The suburbs of Southport and Surfers Paradise form the Gold Coast's commercial centre. The major river in the area is the Nerang River. The heavily developed coastal strip sits on a narrow barrier sandbar between these waterways and the sea.

To the west, the city borders a part of the Great Dividing Range commonly referred to as the Gold Coast hinterland. A  section of the mountain range is protected by Lamington National Park and has been listed as a World Heritage area in recognition of its "outstanding geological features displayed around shield volcanic craters and the high number of rare and threatened rainforest species". The area attracts bushwalkers and day-trippers. Important rainforest pollinating and seed-dispersing Black flying foxes (Pteropus alecto) are found in the area and may be heard foraging at night.

Urban structure 

The City of Gold Coast includes suburbs, localities, towns and rural districts.

The declaration of Southport as a Priority Development Area (PDA) and new investment into the CBD is driving transformative change and creating new business and investment opportunities.

Waterways

Waterfront canal living is a feature of the Gold Coast. Most canal frontage homes have pontoons. The Gold Coast Seaway, between The Spit and South Stradbroke Island, allows vessels direct access to the Pacific Ocean from The Broad and many of the city's canal estates. Breakwaters on either side of the Seaway prevent longshore drift and the bar from silting up. A sand pumping operation on the Spit pipes sand under the Seaway to continue this natural process.

Residential canals were first built in the Gold Coast in the 1950s and construction continues. Most canals are extensions to the Nerang River, but there are more to the south along Tallebudgera Creek and Currumbin Creek and to the north along the Gold Coast Broadwater, South Stradbroke Island, Coomera River and southern Moreton Bay. Early canals included Florida Gardens and Isle of Capri which were under construction at the time of a 1954 flood. Recently constructed canals include Harbour Quays and Riverlinks completed in 2007.

Beaches

There is almost 42km of unbroken beachfront. Duranbah Beach is one of the world's best known surfing beaches and is often thought of as being part of Gold Coast City, but is actually just across the New South Wales state border in the Tweed Shire.

There are also beaches along many of the Gold Coast's  of navigable tidal waterways. Popular inland beaches include Southport, Budds Beach, Marine Stadium, Currumbin Alley, Tallebudgera Estuary, Jacobs Well, Jabiru Island, Paradise Point, Harley Park Labrador, Santa Barbara, Boykambil and Evandale Lake.

Beach safety and management

The Gold Coast has Australia's largest professional surf lifesaving service to protect people on the beaches and to promote surf safety throughout the community. The Queensland Department of Primary Industries carries out the Queensland Shark Control Program (SCP) to protect swimmers from sharks. Sharks are caught by using nets and baited drumlines off the major swimming beaches. Even with the SCP, sharks do range within sight of the patrolled beaches. Lifeguards will clear swimmers from the water if it is considered that there is a safety risk.

Gold Coast beaches have experienced periods of severe beach erosion. In 1967, a series of 11 cyclones removed most of the sand from Gold Coast beaches. The Government of Queensland engaged engineers from Delft University in the Netherlands to advise what to do about the beach erosion. The Delft Report was published in 1971 and outlined a series of works for Gold Coast Beaches including Gold Coast Seaway, works at Narrow Neck that resulted in the Northern Gold Coast Beach Protection Strategy and works at the Tweed River that became the Tweed River Entrance Sand Bypassing Project.

By 2005 most of the recommendations of the 1971 Delft Report had been implemented. City of Gold Coast commenced implementation of the Palm Beach Protection Strategy but ran into considerable opposition from the community participating in a NO REEF protest campaign. The City of Gold Coast Council then committed to completing a review of beach management practices to update the Delft Report. The Gold Coast Shoreline Management Plan will be delivered by organisations including the Environmental Protection Agency, City of Gold Coast and the Griffith Centre for Coastal Management. Gold Coast City is also investing into the quality and capacity of the Gold Coast Oceanway that provides sustainable transport along Gold Coast beaches.

Climate
The Gold Coast experiences a humid subtropical climate (Köppen climate classification Cfa), with mild to warm winters and hot, humid summers. The city experiences substantial summer precipitation mostly concentrated in thunderstorms and heavy showers with rain events occasionally lasting up to a few weeks at a time giving residents "the summer blues", while winter is pleasantly mild to warm with little rain. In fact, it is for this pleasant winter weather that both the city and the Sunshine Coast—the coastal region north of Brisbane—are internationally renowned.

Government

Administratively, the Gold Coast is a local government area called the City of Gold Coast. The City of Gold Coast Council has 14 elected councillors, each representing a division of the City. Businessman Tom Tate is the current Mayor of the Gold Coast, first elected in 2012. Former mayors include Ron Clake, Gary Baildon, Lex Bell, Ray Stevens, Ern Harley and Sir Bruce Small, who was responsible for the development of many of the canal estates that are now home to thousands of Gold Coast residents.

At the state level, the Gold Coast area is represented by eleven members in the Legislative Assembly of Queensland. The seats they hold are: Bonney, Broadwater, Burleigh, Coomera, Currumbin, Gaven, Mermaid Beach, Mudgeeraba, Southport, Surfers Paradise and Theodore. Federally, the Gold Coast area is split between five divisions in the House of Representatives: Fadden (northern), Moncrieff (central) and McPherson (southern) are located entirely within the Gold Coast, while Forde (north-west) and Wright (south-west) encompass parts of the Gold Coast and other areas of Southeast Queensland.

Politically, the Gold Coast has often tilted conservative. It was a Country Party bastion for most of the first three decades after World War II, but increasing urbanisation has made it a Liberal stronghold. Labor has historically only done well around Labrador and Coolangatta. Only one Labor MP has ever represented a significant portion of the Gold Coast at the federal level since 1949; the three Gold Coast divisions have only returned Liberals since 1984. At the state level, Labor was fairly competitive in the Gold Coast for most of the early part of the 21st century. However, as part of its massive landslide in the 2012 state election, the Liberal National Party won every seat there. The LNP repeated its sweep of the Gold Coast seats at the 2015 election, and retained all but one Gold Coast seat at the 2017 state election.

Southport Courthouse is the city's major courthouse and has jurisdiction to hear petty criminal offences and civil matters up to A$250,000. Indictable offences, criminal sentencing and civil matters above A$250,000 are heard in the higher Supreme Court of Queensland which is located in Brisbane. There is also a subsidiary Magistrates Court, located at the southern suburb of Coolangatta.

In 2013 a brawl between members of Outlaw motorcycle gangs also called "bikies" who fought each other outside a Broadbeach restaurant caused mass fear to restaurant patrons and police. This led to the toughest anti-bikie laws introduced in Australia known as Vicious Lawless Association Disestablishment Act 2013.

Economy 

In fifty years, Gold Coast City has grown from a small beachside holiday destination to Australia's sixth largest city (and the country's most populous non-capital city). Situated within South East Queensland's growth corridor, the Gold Coast is one of Australia's fastest growing large cities, with a 5-year annual average population growth rate to 2015 of 1.8%, compared to 1.5% nationally. Gross Regional Product has risen from A$9.7 billion in 2001, to A$15.6 billion in 2008, a rise of 61 percent. Tourism remains fundamental to Gold Coast City's economy, with almost 10 million visitors a year to the area. In the past the economy was driven by the population derived industries of construction, tourism and retail. Some diversification has taken place, with the city now having an industrial base formed of marine, education, information communication and technology, food, tourism, creative, environment and sports industries. These nine industries have been identified as the key industries by the City of Gold Coast Council to deliver the city's economic prosperity. Gold Coast City's unemployment rate (5.6 per cent) is below the national level (5.9 per cent). The declaration of Southport as the Gold Coast central business district (CBD) and a Priority Development Area (PDA), as well as new investment into the CBD, is driving transformative change and creating new business and investment opportunities.

The Gold Coast Economic Development Strategy 2013–2023 outlines the framework for the city's long-term growth and prosperity.  The strategy outlines actions in the following areas, Innovation, Culture, Infrastructure, Competitive business, Workforce, International.

Tourism

Around 10 million tourists visit the Gold Coast area every year consisting of 849,114 international visitors, 3,468,000 domestic overnight visitors and 5,366,000 daytrip visitors. Tourism is the region's biggest industry, directly contributing more than $4.4 billion into the city economy every year and directly accounting for one in four jobs in the city There are approximately 65,000 beds,  of beach,  of canal, 100,000 hectares of nature reserve, 500 restaurants, 40 golf courses and five major theme parks in the city.

Gold Coast Airport provides connection across Australia and internationally with airlines including Flyscoot, Jetstar, Qantas, Air New Zealand, Virgin Australia and Airasia X. Brisbane Airport is less than one hour from the centre of Gold Coast, and direct trains operate.

Tourism is Gold Coast City's main industry, generating a total of $2.5 billion in revenue per annum. The Gold Coast is the most popular tourist destination in Queensland. It is Australia's 5th most visited destination by international tourists.

The city has over 13,000 available guest rooms contributing over $335 million to the local economy each year. Accommodation options available range from hostels to five star resorts and hotels. The most common style of accommodation is three and four star self-contained apartments. Tourist attractions include surf beaches, and theme parks including Dreamworld, Sea World, Wet'n'Wild Water World, Warner Bros. Movie World, WhiteWater World, Topgolf, Currumbin Wildlife Sanctuary, David Fleay Wildlife Park, Australian Outback Spectacular, and Paradise Country.

Since the opening of what was then the world's highest residential tower in 2005 (it is now the fifth highest), the Q1 building has been a destination for tourists and locals alike. It is the second highest public vantage point in the southern hemisphere after the Eureka Tower in Melbourne. The observation deck at level 77 is the highest of its kind in Queensland and offers views in all directions, from Brisbane to Byron Bay. It towers over the Surfers Paradise skyline, with the observation deck 230 metres (755 feet) high, and the spire extending nearly another hundred metres up. In total, the Q1 is 322.5 metres (1058 feet) high, making it the tallest building in Australia. Another famous tourist attraction are the Surfers Paradise Meter Maids, instituted in 1965 to put a positive spin on new parking regulations. To avoid tickets being issued for expired parking, the Meter Maids dispense coins into the meter and leave a calling card under the windscreen wiper of the vehicle. The Maids are still a part of the Surfers Paradise culture but the scheme is now run by private enterprise.

Chinatown, Gold Coast, is an integral part of the revitalisation of Southport as an international CBD.

Film production

The Gold Coast is the major film production hub in Queensland and has accounted for 75% of all film production in Queensland since the 1990s, with an expenditure of around $150 million per year. The Gold Coast is the third largest film production centre in Australia, behind Sydney and Melbourne.

It is the filming site for major motion pictures including Muriel's Wedding (1994), Ghost Ship (2002), Scooby-Doo (2002), House of Wax (2005), Superman Returns (2006), Unbroken (2014), The Inbetweeners 2 (2014), San Andreas (2015), Pirates of the Caribbean: Dead Men Tell No Tales (2017), Kong: Skull Island (2017), Thor: Ragnarok (2017), Pacific Rim: Uprising (2018), Aquaman (2018), Dora the Explorer (2019) and Godzilla vs. Kong (2020).

Village Roadshow Studios are adjacent to the Warner Bros Movie World Theme Park at Oxenford. The Studios consists of eight sound stages, production offices, editing rooms, wardrobe, construction workshops, water tanks and commissary. These sound stages vary in size and have an overall floor area of 10,844 sq metres, making Warner Roadshow Studio one of the largest studio lots in the Southern Hemisphere. The Queensland Government actively supports the film and television production industry in Queensland and provides both non-financial and financial assistance through the Pacific Film and Television Commission.

Culture
The Gold Coast's culture has been impacted by rapid development and traditional marketing programs orbiting around 'sun, sand, surf and sex.'

Despite rapid socio-economic changes and a tourist-centred image, there is evidence of local resident-driven culture (such as surf gangs) in geographical pockets and a broader 'Gold Coaster' identity drawn from globalised resort and real estate marketing material. The Gold Coast hosts cultural activities that attract tourists and residents alike.

Music
Music groups in this region include the Northern Rivers Symphony Orchestra and Operator Please. Musicians Cody Simpson and Ricki-Lee Coulter are from the Gold Coast. Music events include Big Day Out, Good Vibrations Festival, Summafieldayze, the Blues on Broadbeach Festival and V Festival (2007–2009).

Arts
Home of the Arts (HOTA) is the Gold Coast's premier cultural facility for visual and performing arts with a performance theatre, two cinemas and an underground venue. The theatre has hosted performance by the Imperial Russian Ballet, The Australian Ballet and the Queensland Ballet. Musicals, plays and a variety of performances are regularly scheduled. The city is also home to the Gold Coast City Art Gallery. Film festivals and the Comedy Club host international artists. A redeveloped Gold Coast cultural precinct opened before the city hosted the 2018 Commonwealth Games.

Bleach* The Gold Coast Festival takes place annually across the City in August. The program is one of Australia's leading and most exciting site-specific contemporary arts programs. Quintessentially Gold Coast, Bleach* celebrates the city's most dynamic and adventurous artists, welcomes renowned Australian and international collaborators and engages a broad audience through a range of events. Bleach* has attracted more than 470,000 people since its inaugural year in 2012. The program features work across all genres including dance, theatre, contemporary music, opera, installations, circus and major public events.

Sport

The two most popular sports on the Gold Coast are Australian rules football and rugby league, of which the city is represented by professional teams in two most popular national competitions:

Burleigh Bears rugby league football club play in the Queensland Cup and have won four premierships (in 1999, 2004, 2016 and 2019).

Recreational activities on the Gold Coast include surfing, fishing, cycling, boating and golf. The Gold Coast area has numerous golf links, including Hope Island, Sanctuary Cove and The Glades.

Sporting facilities include the Carrara Stadium, Carrara Indoor Sport Centre, Nerang Velodrome and the Sports Super Centre. Some of these facilities are being superseded by newer and larger capacity facilities. Two examples of these are the Gold Coast Convention & Exhibition Centre to play host to a Gold Coast Basketball team and Robina Stadium to host NRL games.

Former World Wrestling Entertainment performer Nathan Jones comes from the Gold Coast, as do Olympic gold medal winning swimmer Grant Hackett, 2011 US Open tennis champion Samantha Stosur and Sally Pearson (who received the keys to the city).

The Gold Coast has garnered a reputation as a "sporting graveyard", as many of the professional clubs that have represented the Gold Coast in national leagues since the 1980s experience generally poor on-field performances, consistently struggle to support themselves financially, and have generally folded within a decade of being founded; as of 2019 no Gold Coast-based team has won a premiership in a national professional club competition.

Olympic and Paralympic Games 
Gold Coast will be one of the three zones for the 2032 Summer Olympics and 2032 Summer Paralympics in Brisbane to use the venues as the 2018 Commonwealth Games. The Gold Coast Zone will have seven venues, and will host nine Olympic and six Paralympic sports. The Gold Coast Convention & Exhibition Centre will be used for the preliminary Volleyball along with Powerlifting and Sitting Volleyball during the Paralympics. Broadbeach Park Stadium will host Beach Volleyball for Olympics as well in the Football 5-a-side in the Paralympics. The Gold Coast Sports and Leisure Centre will be used for Judo and Wrestling in the Olympics and Boccia in the Paralympics. Southport Broadwater Parklands to be used for Triathlon and Marathon Swimming in the Olympics and will be used for Paratriathlon in the Paralympics. Coomera Indoor Sports Centre will host the Volleyball for the Olympics and will be used for Wheelchair Rugby in the Paralympics. The Robina Stadium will host the preliminary football matches. The Carrara Stadium could potentially host the Cricket matches if the IOC approves cricket in the 2028 Olympic Games in Los Angeles.

Commonwealth Games 

The 2018 Commonwealth Games was held on the Gold Coast between 4 and 15 April 2018 which was an international multi-sport event for members of the Commonwealth. It was the fifth time Australia had hosted the Commonwealth Games and the first time a major multi-sport event achieved gender equality by having an equal number of events for male and female athletes. More than 4,400 athletes including 300 para-athletes from 71 Commonwealth Games Associations took part in the event.

The venues such as Carrara Stadium, Carrara Sports and Leisure Centre, Carrara Indoor Sports Stadium, Gold Coast Convention & Exhibition Centre. Broadbeach Bowls Club Nerang Mountain Bike Trails, Coomera Indoor Sports Centre, Oxenford Studios, The Gold Coast Hockey Centre, Southport Broadwater Parklands, Gold Coast Aquatic Centre, Robina Stadium, The Currumbin Beachfront, and Coolangatta Beachfront were used for the Games.

Other events

The Gold Coast 600 (formerly known as the Gold Coast Indy 300) is a car racing event held annually, usually in October. The Surfers Paradise Street Circuit through the streets of Surfers Paradise and Main Beach. The GC 600 comprises many other events such as the Indy Undie Ball and the Miss Indy Competition. Formerly an IndyCar event, V8 Supercars are now the headline attraction, using a similar track route, as the circuit was cut in half by a hairpin.

The Magic Millions horse racing auction at the Gold Coast Turf Club was the brainchild of entrepreneurs Gerry Harvey and John Singleton. There are plans to relocate and build a state-of-the-art new racetrack at Palm Meadows which will incorporate the Magic Million sale with facilities for up to 4,000 horses.

Each June, Coolangatta hosts Cooly Rocks On, a two-week 1950s and 1960s nostalgia festival with free entertainment and attractions, including hot rods, restored cars and revival bands playing music of the era. Every July, more than 25,000 congregate on the Gold Coast from around the world to participate in the Gold Coast Marathon. It is also the largest annual community sporting event held on the Gold Coast. In 2015, it will be held on 4–5 July and the 37th Gold Coast Airport Marathon is set to motivate and challenge more than 25,000 people of all ages and abilities.

In August Currumbin hosts the annual half distance Challenge Gold Coast triathlon, with the 1.9 km swim taking place in the Currumbin River, the 90 km bike going through the Currumbin and Tallebudgera Valleys in the Hinterland, and the 21.1 km run going along the beach to Elephant Rock and Tugun.

Late November to early December sees thousands of school leavers across the country descend on the Gold Coast for Schoolies week, a two-week period of celebration and parties throughout Surfers Paradise, hosted by the City of Gold Coast. The event is often criticised nationally and locally for its portrayal of drinking and acts of violence, however every effort by the Queensland Police Service and State Government to ensure all school leavers have a good time are put into place, including locals volunteering by walking the streets and keeping an eye out for those in need of assistance. Early each year the Gold Coast hosts one leg of the ASP World Tour of surfing, where some of the worlds best surfers compete in the Quiksilver Pro at Coolangatta.

The Arts Centre Gold Coast located in Evandale, features a fine art gallery featuring local and international works from painting to sculpture and new media. In addition, there is a theatre for live productions including musicals as well two arts cinemas showing foreign and independent films from Australia and abroad.

Chinatown, Gold Coast, located in Southport, hosts the annual citywide Lunar New Year festival as well as regular monthly events.

Media

Print
The daily local newspaper is the Gold Coast Bulletin which is published by News Corporation. National surfing magazine Australia's Surfing Life is published in the Gold Coast suburb of Burleigh Heads by Morrison Media.

Major daily newspapers such as The Courier-Mail and its sibling The Sunday Mail from Brisbane, The Daily Telegraph, The Sunday Telegraph (Sydney), The Sydney Morning Herald and The Sun-Herald from Sydney and The Age, The Sunday Age, The Herald Sun and the Sunday Herald-Sun from Melbourne as well as national publications The Australian and The Australian Financial Review are all available for purchase on the Gold Coast. Other major interstate newspapers and newspapers from neighbouring regions owned by News Corporation or Australian Community Media are also available for purchase via retail outlets on the Gold Coast.

Television
The Gold Coast straddles the boundary between the television licence areas of both Brisbane (metropolitan) and Northern NSW (regional): the Brisbane primary channels are Seven's BTQ, Nine's QTQ and 10's TVQ, while the regional affiliates are Seven's NEN, Nine’s NBN and WIN Television’s NRN.

Both sets of commercial stations are available throughout the Gold Coast, as well as the ABC and SBS television services. Other channels include 10 Bold, 10 Peach, 10 Shake, Sky News Regional (regional only), ABC TV Plus/ABC Kids, ABC Me, ABC News, SBS World Movies, SBS Viceland, SBS Food, SBS WorldWatch, NITV, SBS WorldWatch, 7two, 7mate, 7Bravo, 7flix, 9Gem, 9Go!, 9Rush & 9Life. Subscription television service Foxtel is also available.

Of the main metropolitan and regional commercial networks:
Seven News and Nine News both produce half-hour local bulletins at 5.30pm on weeknights, broadcasting from studios in Surfers Paradise. These bulletins air as opt-outs on the respective metropolitan stations (BTQ7 and QTQ9) ahead of the main 6pm news from Brisbane.
NBN airs NBN News, an hour-long regional program combining regional, national and international news - including local opt-outs for the Gold Coast and Northern Rivers - every night at 6pm. It broadcasts from studios in Newcastle with reporters based in Lismore and Surfers Paradise.
WIN Television's 10 Northern NSW airs short local news updates for the Gold Coast/Lismore district throughout the day.

Radio
There are numerous commercial, ABC and community stations broadcasting along the Gold Coast.

The Gold Coast's FM commercial and community stations include 92.5 Triple M, Hit Network's 90.9 Sea FM, Hot Tomato, 94.1FM, Juice107.3, Radio Metro and 4CRB.

91.7 ABC Gold Coast is the local ABC station on the Gold Coast, which is complemented by the ABC's national radio services including 
Triple J, ABC Radio National, ABC NewsRadio and ABC Classic FM.

A number of narrowcast services are also available on the Gold Coast including Raw FM and Vision Radio.

The Gold Coast can also easily receive Brisbane and Northern NSW FM and AM stations.

Education

Colleges and universities 
The Gold Coast is home to two major university campuses: Bond University at Robina and Griffith University at Southport. Southern Cross University also operates a smaller campus in Bilinga near the Gold Coast Airport. The Gold Coast Institute of Technical and Further Education (TAFE) has five campuses at Southport, Ridgeway (Ashmore), Benowa, Coomera and Coolangatta.

Schools and libraries 
There are over 100 primary and secondary schools, both public and private and of a variety of denominations, including the selective state high school Queensland Academy for Health Sciences and single-sex private schools The Southport School and St Hilda's School. The longest established public school on the Gold Coast is Southport State High School, having originally opened in 1916. There are a number of libraries located on the Gold Coast. For a full list see Gold Coast libraries.

Infrastructure

Utilities
Electricity

Electricity for the Gold Coast is sourced from Powerlink Queensland at bulk supply substations which is provided via the National Electricity Market from an interconnected multi-State power system. The Government-owned electricity corporation Energex distributes and retails electricity, natural gas, liquefied petroleum gas (LPG) and value-added products and services to residential, industrial and commercial customers in South-East Queensland.

Water supply

The Little Nerang Dam which feeds into Hinze Dam can supplement part of the city area's water needs, and both are managed by the city council directorate Gold Coast Water. Reforms of the way in which the water industry is structured have been announced by the State Government, with transfer of ownership and management of water services from local government to the state occurring in 2008–09. City of Gold Coast also sources water from Wivenhoe Dam, west of Brisbane for northern suburbs when the Hinze Dam, at one-tenth of Wivenhoe's capacity, becomes low.

Water shortage and water restrictions have been current local issues, and a few new Gold Coast residential areas have recently included dual reticulation in their planning and development to supply water from a new water recycling plant being built concurrently. This will make available highly treated recycled water for use around the home in addition to potable water. The Gold Coast has received world recognition for this scheme in its Pimpama-Coomera suburbs.

Gold Coast Water has also been recognised for its world leading HACCP water quality management system by the World Health Organization which published Gold Coast Water's system as a good model for managing water quality and safety from catchment to tap. The Gold Coast desalination plant, which opened in February 2009, has the capacity to supply up to 133 megalitres of desalinated water per day.

Transport 
The car is the dominant mode of transport in the Gold Coast, with over 70% of people using it as their sole mode of travelling to work. The Gold Coast has an extensive network of arterial roads that link coastal suburbs with inland suburbs. In recent years, local and state governments have invested money in transport infrastructure on the Gold Coast to combat the increasing congestion on many of the city's roads. The Gold Coast has an extensive public transport network that includes buses, heavy rail & the new light rail for commuting to work, visiting attractions, and travelling to other destinations.

Road 
A number of major roads connect the Gold Coast with Brisbane, New South Wales, and the surrounding areas. The Pacific Motorway (M1) is the main motorway in the area. Beginning at the Logan Motorway (M6) in Brisbane, it travels through the inland Gold Coast region and links with the Pacific Highway at the New South Wales/Queensland border near Tweed Heads. Before the Tugun Bypass was completed in 2008, the motorway ended at Tugun. The Gold Coast Highway services the coastal suburbs of the Gold Coast, including Surfers Paradise, Southport, and Burleigh Heads. Starting at the Pacific Motorway at Tweed Heads, it runs parallel to the coast until it reaches Labrador, where it turns inland to meet the Pacific Motorway again at Helensvale. Other arterial roads include the Smith Street Motorway which connects Southport, Gold Coast’s CBD with the M1 in Parkwood. Other major roads include Reedy Creek Road, Nerang–Broadbeach Road, Robina Parkway and Southport–Burleigh Road.

Light rail 

The Gold Coast's light rail service is called G:link, a  line between Helensvale and Broadbeach that also connects the key activity centres of Southport and Surfers Paradise. The G:link was opened in 2014 between Broadbeach and Southport, with an extension to Helensvale completed in 2017 in preparation for the 2018 Commonwealth Games.

Heavy rail 
Queensland Rail operates a intra-city rail service from Brisbane to the Gold Coast along the Gold Coast railway line. The line follows the same route as Brisbane's Beenleigh railway line, continuing on after reaching Beenleigh. It then follows a route similar to that of the Pacific Motorway, passing stations at Ormeau, Coomera, Helensvale, Nerang and Robina before terminating at Varsity Lakes. An extension of the Gold Coast line to the Gold Coast Airport is proposed.

Bus 
Kinetic Group (formely Surfiside Buslines prior to a re-branding in 2022) operates all public passenger services in the city under contract by TransLink which coordinates the public transport network in South East Queensland. Services are frequent during the day, with intervals being as little as 5 minutes. Kinetic Group operates over a fleet of over 400 buses operating on over 70 lines covering the entire city

Airport 
Services are provided to interstate capitals and major cities as well as to major New Zealand cities, Malaysia, Japan and Singapore. It is the sixth busiest airport in Australia.

Projects
The Gold Coast has been debating a controversial cruise ship terminal
 A third extension of the G:link to Burleigh Heads is planned with fesability studies and community consultation currently underway. 
 The existing heavy rail Gold Coast line will be extended to Coolangatta

Notable people 
 Megan Anderson, MMA fighter
Jack Doohan, racing driver and son of Mick Doohan
 Mick Doohan, five-time 500 cc Grand Prix motorcycle racing world champion
Broc Feeney, racing driver
Zane Goddard, racing driver
Amy Shark, singer-songwriter and producer
 Cody Simpson, Swimmer and singer
 Toni Storm, professional wrestler

See also 

 Gold Coast hinterland

References

External links 

 
 
 
 
 
 
 
 Explore Gold Coast Everything About Gold Coast

 Destination Gold Coast – Official Tourism website
 Gold Coast City Council
 Libraries Gold Coast City Council
 TransLink – Public transport – bus train ferry
 Gold Coast and Surrounds Tourism Australia

 
1823 establishments in Australia
Coastal cities in Australia
Populated places established in 1823
Seaside resorts in Australia